Alberto Paloschi (born 4 January 1990) is an Italian professional footballer who plays as a striker for  club Siena.

Club career

Milan
Paloschi won the National Under-17s Championship with Milan in the 2006–07 season. He scored 3 goals in a 4–0 win over Genoa in the final.

Paloschi made his professional debut on 20 December 2007, scoring in the first leg of the Coppa Italia round of 16 against Catania, and scored a second goal in the return leg on 16 January 2008.

He made his Serie A debut on 10 February 2008 against Siena replacing Serginho, and scored the game's only goal with his first touch, just seventeen seconds after coming on. He started the next Serie A match against Livorno. On 19 March he scored A.C. Milan's only goal in a 2–1 home loss against Sampdoria.

Parma
Upon Ronaldinho's signing for the club, Paloschi said that, as his first-team chances were threatened, he would consider a move (preferably on loan) away from San Siro. On 27 August he moved to Parma, who'd just been relegated to Serie B in a co-ownership deal worth €2.25 million. He scored 12 goals in his first season with Parma, helping the club return to the top flight after only one season in the Serie B. In June 2009, Milan and Parma reached an agreement which would see Paloschi return to Parma for the 2009–10 season.

Genoa
On 3 January 2011, Parma sold the 50% registration rights of Paloschi that the club held to Genoa for €4.35 million and signed 50% registration rights of Raffaele Palladino from Genoa for €3 million, which Milan and Juventus retained the other 50% registration rights respectively, effectively made Genoa pay Parma €1.35 million in cash plus Palladino for Paloschi. Genoa also signed Luca Antonelli for €7 million and sold Francesco Modesto to Parma for €2.5 million, effectively made Genoa pay €4.5 million cash plus Modesto to Parma for Antonelli.

Paloschi made 12 appearances for Genoa, scoring 2 goals in the process. In June 2011 Milan bought back Paloschi from Genoa for €5 million, €650,000 over the previous fee.

Return to Milan
At the end of 2010–11 season, Paloschi returned to Milan for €5 million on a five-year contract. Paloschi immediately left for Chievo in an initial temporary deal, with an option to buy.

Chievo
On 8 August 2011, Paloschi joined Chievo on loan for the 2011–12 season for a fee of €450,000. On 18 September 2011 he scored his first goal for Chievo in a 2–1 defeat against Parma. On 22 January 2012, Paloschi scored a brace against Lecce. In July 2012 the loan was renewed for another year for free. On 31 January 2013, Chievo signed Paloschi in a co-ownership deal for €3.5 million. On 19 June 2014, Chievo purchased the remaining 50% registration rights of Paloschi from Milan for another €3 million. On 30 June 2015, Paloschi signed a new four-year contract with Chievo.

Swansea City
On 29 January 2016, Paloschi joined Premier League club Swansea City on a three-and-a-half-year deal for a fee believed to be in the range of £8 million. He opened his Premier League scoring account against Tottenham Hotspur on 28 February.

Atalanta
On 17 June 2016, Paloschi returned to Italy, signing a deal with Atalanta.

SPAL
On 7 July 2017, Paloschi was loaned to newly promoted Serie A side SPAL. On 20 June 2018, SPAL decided to turn Paloschi's loan into a permanent deal for undisclosed fee.

Cagliari
On 31 January 2020, Paloschi joined Cagliari on loan until 30 June 2020.

Siena
On 19 August 2021, Serie C club Siena confirmed an agreement to sign free agent Paloschi on a contract until 2025.

International career
Paloschi scored two goals for Italy in the 2008 UEFA European Under-19 Football Championship.

On 18 November 2008, he made his debut for the Italy U-21 squad in a friendly match against Germany. He was selected to represent Italy in the 2009 U-21 Championship in Sweden. In March 2014 Paloschi received a call-up from Cesare Prandelli. Paloschi was re-called by Antonio Conte on 31 May 2015, again for the training camp.

Career statistics

References

External links

La Gazzetta 

1990 births
Living people
People from Chiari, Lombardy
Sportspeople from the Province of Brescia
Footballers from Lombardy
Italian footballers
Association football forwards
Serie A players
Serie B players
Serie C players
A.C. Milan players
Parma Calcio 1913 players
Genoa C.F.C. players
A.C. ChievoVerona players
Atalanta B.C. players
S.P.A.L. players
Cagliari Calcio players
A.C.N. Siena 1904 players
Premier League players
Swansea City A.F.C. players
Italian expatriate footballers
Italian expatriate sportspeople in Wales
Expatriate footballers in Wales
Italy youth international footballers
Italy under-21 international footballers